Baldwin Park High School is located in Baldwin Park, California.  It is part of the Baldwin Park Unified School District.  It is one of three high schools in the city, Sierra Vista High School and North Park Continuation School being the other two.  Usually the students attending this high school are the ones coming from Holland Middle School (6-8), Olive Middle School (6-8), Santa Fe Elementary (3-8) and about half from Jones Junior High (7-8) and very few from Sierra Vista Junior High (7-8).The school colors are Royal blue, white and silver. The school mascot is a Brave (Native American).

Teachers
While the state average has one full-time teacher for 20 students, in this school it is 32 students per teacher.  98% of the teachers in the school have full teaching credential, while the other 2% have emergency ones.   Most teachers Baldwin Park High School have been in the BPUSD an average of 11 years.

Demographics

According to U.S. News & World Report, 99% of Baldwin Park's student body is "of color," with 88% of the student body coming from an economically disadvantaged household, determined by student eligibility for California's Reduced-price meal program.

Sports
Baldwin Park offers the following sports: Baseball, Softball, Football, Basketball, Tennis, Badminton, Wrestling, Track & Field, Cross Country running, Cheerleading, Swimming, Volleyball, Water Polo and Soccer.

Entertainment Corps
The Baldwin Park HS Marching Band and Colorguard have been finalists at the SCSBOA (Southern California Band and Orchestra Association) for the past nine years (since 2005).
The Winterguard is the current WGASC Champion in the Intermediate A Division. The drumline is a former two-time champion in the Scholastic A division for American Drumline Association. It now competes in the Southern California Percussion Alliance.

Baldwin Park is mostly known for its soccer team. Although football is still considered the main sport on campus, the low competitive level has caused the football team to lose prestige and reputation. On the other side, soccer is the second-biggest sport in school because over 85% of students have Latino descent. The current rise in the sport's popularity and level of competition has caused the Baldwin Park Braves to achieve CIF finals 5 years in a row. The team has managed to make it to three championship games and has won one CIF championship under the leadership of coach Ricardo Mira.

At the WGASC 2013 Championship competitions, Baldwin Park High school placed 8th out of 9 teams in the division..

Notable alumni
    
 Jeffrey Keller former NFL player 
 Gary Allen, former NFL player
 Ron Brown: 1984 Olympic gold medalist, former NFL player (1984-1991) 
 J. J. Davis, former professional baseball player (Pittsburgh Pirates, Washington Nationals)
 Roger Freed, former professional baseball player (Baltimore Orioles, Philadelphia Phillies, Cincinnati Reds, Montreal Expos, St. Louis Cardinals)
 Mike Haffner, former NFL player
 Randy Knorr: executive for Washington Nationals, former professional baseball player (Toronto Blue Jays, Houston Astros, Florida Marlins, Texas Rangers, Montreal Expos) 
 Fred McNeill, 1970, former NFL player
 Rod McNeill, 1969, former NFL player
 Kent McCord, actor, Adam-12
 Lawrence Phillips, former NFL player and CFL Grey Cup champion (2002)
Richard Kiel, actor, "Jaws (James Bond)"
 Mari Nichols-Haining (née Parker), 1987, author and poet.
 Bernardo Flores., major league baseball player, Chicago White Sox, debut Sep. 3, 2020

Pop Culture

Roger Freed, graduated from Baldwin Park High School and was a Major League baseball player for 7 years on various National League teams.
Kent McCord who graduated from BPHS - Star of Adam-12 in 1968.
Fred McNeill who played 4 years of football at UCLA and 11 years as linebacker for the Minnesota Vikings graduated from BPHS in 1970.

References

External links

High schools in Los Angeles County, California
Valle Vista League
Public high schools in California
Educational institutions established in 1956
1956 establishments in California